The 1908 United States presidential election in Louisiana took place on November 3, 1908. All contemporary 46 states were part of the 1908 United States presidential election. State voters chose nine electors to the Electoral College, which selected the president and vice president.

Louisiana was won by the Democratic nominees, former Representative William Jennings Bryan of Nebraska and his running mate John W. Kern of Indiana. With 84.63 percent of the popular vote, Louisiana would also prove to be Bryan's third strongest victory in terms of percentage in the popular vote only after South Carolina and Mississippi.

Results

See also
 United States presidential elections in Louisiana

Notes

References

Louisiana
1908
1908 Louisiana elections